The 2021 SWAC Championship Game was a college football game played on December 4, 2021, at Mississippi Veterans Memorial Stadium in Jackson, Mississippi. It was the 23rd edition of the SWAC Championship Game and determined the champion of the Southwestern Athletic Conference (SWAC) for the 2021 season. The game began at 3:00 p.m. CST and aired on ESPN2. The game featured the Jackson State Tigers, the East Division champions, and the Prairie View A&M Panthers, the West Division champions. Sponsored by wireless service provider Cricket and by beverage corporation PepsiCo through their Pepsi Zero Sugar brand, the game was officially known as the 2021 Cricket SWAC Football Championship presented by Pepsi Zero Sugar. The winner of the game received a bid to the Celebration Bowl to face the South Carolina State Bulldogs, champions of the Mid-Eastern Athletic Conference (MEAC).

Teams

Prairie View A&M

Prairie View A&M clinched its spot in the championship game on November 20, via Jackson State's defeat of Alcorn State.

Jackson State

Jackson State clinched its spot in the championship game on November 13 after defeating Southern, 21–17. Jackson State clinched home field advantage in the game on November 20 after defeating Alcorn State, 24–10.

Game summary

Statistics

References

Championship Game
2021 12
Jackson State Tigers football games
Prairie View A&M Panthers football games
College sports in Mississippi
Sports competitions in Mississippi
Sports in Jackson, Mississippi
SWAC Championship Game
SWAC Championship Game